Streblus is a genus of flowering plants in the mulberry family, Moraceae. The genus is found in the Pacific across Southeast Asia, Eastern Australia, New Zealand and the Pacific Islands.  Species include:

Streblus asper Lour. – Siamese rough bush
Streblus banksii – large-leaved milk tree
Streblus brunonianus
Streblus elongatus
Streblus heterophyllus – small-leaved milk tree
Streblus ilicifolius (Vidal) Corner
Streblus pendulinus (Endl.) F.Muell – aiai (Eastern Australia, Melanesia, Micronesia, Polynesia)
Streblus sclerophyllus Corner
Streblus smithii – Three Kings milk tree
Streblus taxoides (Roth) Kurz.

References

 
Moraceae genera
Taxonomy articles created by Polbot